This is an episode summary of British TV comedy show Two of a Kind, starring Morecambe and Wise.

The show ran for a total of six series on the ITV network between 1961 and 1968, although only Series 2-6 were broadcast under the title Two of a Kind; Series 1 was transmitted under the title Sir Bernard Delfont Presents Morecambe & Wise. Series 6 was recorded for transmission both by ITV and by ABC in the United States. This was extended from 30 to 60 minutes and, for the US transmission, was given the title The Piccadilly Palace.

Overview

Series One (October–December 1961)
Broadcast under the title Sir Bernard Delfont Presents Morecambe & Wise. All episodes missing.

Series Two (June–September 1962)
First series broadcast under the Two of a Kind title. All episodes extant.

Series Three (June–September 1963)
All episodes extant.

Series Four (April–June 1964)
Episode length increased to 35 minutes. All episodes extant.

Series Five (January–March 1966)
All episodes extant.

Series Six (October 1967–October 1968)
Episode length increased to 60 minutes and recorded in colour. Millicent Martin features as regular guest. Broadcast from May–August 1967 as The Piccadilly Palace in the United States; first ten episodes broadcast October 1967–March 1968 on ITV; final episode broadcast October 1968. UK episodes 1 and 2 exist as B&W telerecordings.

Home media
In 1995, ITC released a total of six hour-long VHS "Best of" collections of Two of a Kind. In 2011, Network released what they advertised as the "first" series of Two of a Kind on DVD - this is in fact Series 2, which was the first broadcast under the title. This was subsequently to be followed by Series 3, although this never received a release. In 2016, the company released "The Complete Series", containing all episodes from Series 2-5, plus the two surviving editions of Series 6. In 2021, Network announced plans to re-release all of the remaining episodes of Two of a Kind in a single box set with all episodes of Morecambe & Wise's 1978-1983 series for Thames Television, to be titled as Morecambe & Wise at ITV.

Notes

References

External links
Morecambe & Wise website
Eric And Ern – Keeping The Magic Alive  **Book, Film, TV Reviews, Interviews**

ITV-related lists
Lists of British comedy television series episodes
Episodes